Naguib Kheraj (born July 1964) is a British banker.

Early life
Naguib Kheraj was born in July 1964. Kheraj was educated at Dulwich College, London, and Cambridge University, where he graduated with a degree in economics. A member of the Ismaili community, Kheraj grew up in eastern Africa, Switzerland, Pakistan and the Middle East.

Career
Kheraj began his banking career at Salomon Brothers in 1986, and went on to hold a number of senior positions at other international financial institutions.  Over the course of 12 years at Barclays, Kheraj served as group finance director and vice-chairman, as well as in various business leadership positions.  He was chief executive officer (CEO) of JP Morgan Cazenove, a London-based investment banking business.

Kheraj is a former non-executive director of NHS England, and has served as a senior advisor to Her Majesty's Revenue and Customs and to the Financial Services Authority in the UK.  He has served as a member of the board of the UK-US Fulbright Commission, on the Investment Committee of the Wellcome Trust and the Finance Committee of Oxford University Press.

Kheraj is Chairman of Rothesay Life, a specialist pensions insurer, Deputy Chairman of Standard Chartered, an international banking group and serves on the finance committee of the University of Cambridge.

Kheraj spends a substantial portion of his time as a senior advisor to the Aga Khan Development Network, and serves on the Boards of various entities therein including the Aga Khan University, the University of Central Asia and The Institute of Ismaili Studies. He is also chairman of its endowment committee.

See also
 List of British Pakistanis

References

Living people
Bankers from London
People educated at Dulwich College
Alumni of the University of Cambridge
British chief executives
British expatriates in Pakistan
British Ismailis
1964 births
British people of Pakistani descent